The 2002 AFL draft consisted of a pre-season draft, a national draft, a trade period and the elevation of rookies.  The AFL draft is the annual draft of talented players by Australian rules football teams that participate in the main competition of that sport, the Australian Football League.

In 2002 there were 88 picks to be drafted between 16 teams in the national draft.

Carlton forfeited its priority and first round draft picks due to gross salary cap breaches (it would have also forfeited its second round pick, but they had already traded it to Port Adelaide for Barnaby French). Carlton's punishment came on the back of a dismal 2002 season in which it won its first ever wooden spoon after 105 years of competition. The first pick therefore went to St Kilda, who finished second last during the 2002 AFL season.

This was the first draft since their introduction in 1993 that no team received a priority pick, as St Kilda had a record of 5–16–1 (giving them 22 premiership points, above the 20.5 premiership points needed to qualify for a priority pick under the rules at the time).

Trades

2002 national draft

2003 pre-season draft

2003 rookie draft

Rookie elevation
This list details 2002-listed rookies who were elevated to the senior list; it does not list players taken as rookies in the rookie draft which occurred during the 2002/03 off-season.

See also
 Official AFL draft page

AFL Draft
Australian Football League draft
VFL Draft